Iihongo is a village in the northern part of Namibia, exactly 25 km east from the town of Ondangwa. The village was first founded in 1989. It played a great part in the struggle for the countries independence, this was because of the headman, who was known as Nehale ya Mpingana who in 1908 directed the Ndonga people to attack the Germans at a place called Namutoni. 

Today, the village is under the rule of Leonard Mwandingi. Development in the town is very slow but the community is hard at work in changing that, as there are several development groups like the "Tunga Egumbo development Fund" that tries to gather money for building houses in the community.

Populated places in the Oshikoto Region